Alessio Ruci (born 31 January 1996) is an Albanian professional footballer who plays as a defensive midfielder for Tolentino in the Serie D.

Club career

Cremonese
On 9 January 2015, Perugia loaned out Ruci to Lega Pro side U.S. Cremonese with purchase option. However just a few weeks later, on 25 January, Cremonese announced to have signed definitively Ruci by purchasing him immediately.

First match of Ruci with Cremonese came on 15 February 2015 against Bassano Virtus in where he was present on the bench for the entire match. He managed to make his first professional debut in his second match with Cremonese on 10 May 2015 against Giana Erminio coming on as a substitute in the 87th minute in place of Alessandro Marchi.

In January 2017, he was loaned to Bassano.

Savoia
On 26 September 2018, Ruçi signed for Savoia.

Fermana
On 9 August 2020 he joined Fermana. On 23 September 2020, his Fermana contract was terminated by mutual consent due to "personal reasons". On the next day, he returned to his previous club Tolentino.

International career

Albania U17
Ruci was invited for the first time at the Albania national under-17 football team by the coach Džemal Mustedanagić to participate in the 2013 UEFA European Under-21 Championship qualification in October 2012. He played every minute in all 3 matches of the tournament.

Albania U19
Ruçi was called up to the Albania national under-19 football team by the coach Altin Lala for the friendly match against Italy U19 on 17 December 2014.

Career statistics

Club

References

External links

1996 births
Living people
People from Castiglione del Lago
Italian people of Albanian descent
Association football midfielders
Albanian footballers
Albania youth international footballers
U.S. Cremonese players
Vis Pesaro dal 1898 players
L'Aquila Calcio 1927 players
A.C. Savoia 1908 players
Fermana F.C. players
Serie C players
Serie D players
Sportspeople from the Province of Perugia
Footballers from Umbria